Lakshmi is one of the major Goddess in Hinduism.

Lakshmi may also refer to:

Film 
 Lakshmi (1977 film), a 1977 Malayalam-language film
 Lakshmi (1982 film), a 1982 Hindi-language film
 Lakshmi (2006 film), a film released in 2006 starring Venkatesh
 Lakshmi (2013 film), a 2013 Kannada film directed by Raghava Loki
 Lakshmi (2014 film),  a 2014 Hindi film directed by Nagesh Kukunoor
 Lakshmi (2018 film), a 2018 Indian Tamil-language film directed by A. L. Vijay
 Lakshmi Narasimha, a film released in 2004 starring Balakrishna

People 
Lakshmi (actress) (born 1952), Indian actress
Lakshmi (writer) (1921–1987), Indian writer
Laxmikant Berde (1954–2004), actor
Lakshmi Kant Jha (1913–1988), Indian bureaucrat and diplomat
Lakshmi Menon (model) (born 1981), model
Lakshmi Menon (actress) (born 1996), actress
Lakshmi Mittal (born 1950), businessman
Lakshmi Narayanan (born 1953), of Cognizant Technology Solutions
Lakshmi Panabaka, politician
Lakshmi Persaud (born 1939), novelist
Lakshmi Pratury, of The INK Conference
Lakshmi Rai, actress
Lakshmi Sahgal (1914–2012), lieutenant in the Indian National Army
Lakshmi Shankar (1926–2013), classical vocalist
Lakshmi Singh, NPR Newscaster
Lakshmi Tatma (born 2005), born in 2005 with eight limbs
Lakshamilavan (1899–1961), Thai princess
N. P. Jhansi Lakshmi (1941–2011), politician from Andhra Pradesh
Padma Lakshmi (born 1970), model
Lakshmy Ramakrishnan (born 1970), Tamil actress
Rani Lakshmibai, queen of the Jhansi, leading figure of the Indian Rebellion of 1857
Sri Lakshmi (actress), Indian Telugu-language comic actress

Other 
Lakshmi Mills, a cloth and textile yarn manufacturer
Lakshmi Machine Works, owned by Lakshmi Mills
Lakshmi Planum, a feature of the planet Venus
TVS Matriculation Higher Secondary School, formerly known as TVS Lakshmi School

See also

Lakmé, an opera by Léo Delibes whose title is the French form of Lakshmi

Hindu given names
Sanskrit-language names
Indian feminine given names
Indian given names
Nepalese given names
Telugu names
Telugu given names